Esther "Ettie" Steinberg (11 January 1914 –  4 September 1942; married name Ettie Gluck) was one of only a few Irish Jews killed in the Holocaust in the second World War.

Early life
Steinberg was born to Aaron Hirsh Steinberg and Bertha Roth, on 11 January 1914, in Veretsky, Austria-Hungary; the family moved to Dublin in 1925. Her family included six siblings and lived at 28 Raymond Street, near the South Circular Road in Dublin. They were educated in St Catherine's School in Donore Avenue.

Life
Steinberg worked as a seamstress in Dublin where she met and married Belgian Vogtjeck Gluck in Greenville Hall synagogue in Dublin on 22 July 1937. The couple returned to his home in Antwerp. However the rising tensions of the Nazi actions meant they moved to be further away, and Leon, their son, was born in Paris.

Death
They continued to flee the approaching Germans and eventually succeeded in gaining visas to travel to Northern Ireland, arranged by the Steinberg family in Dublin. However the papers arrived a day too late. The family were rounded up and put on a train to Auschwitz where Steinberg, her husband and her son were murdered.

Clearly aware of what the danger was, Steinberg wrote a postcard to her family and threw it from the train. It read "Uncle Lechem, we did not find, but we found Uncle Tisha B'Av" which meant "we did not find bread (Hebrew לחם), but we found destruction (תשעה באב‎, a holiday that marks several tragedies in Jewish history)." A stranger found the postcard and posted it. They arrived on 4 September 1942 and, it is believed, were immediately executed.

Memorials
A memorial to her is at a secondary school in Malahide, Co Dublin, as well as at the Irish Jewish Museum in Portobello, Dublin. In June 2022, a Stolperstein memorial was placed outside her primary school on Donore Avenue, along with similar markings for her husband, son, and three other Irish Jews executed in the Holocaust.

References

1914 births
1942 deaths
20th-century Irish women
Executed Irish women
Irish emigrants to Belgium
Irish Jews who died in the Holocaust